ANTM may refer to:

America's Next Top Model, the fashion-themed reality TV show and the original Top Model franchise

Its international versions:
Asia's Next Top Model, the pan-Asian English-language version of the franchise featuring contestants from the Far East
Australia's Next Top Model, the Australian version of the franchise
Austria's Next Topmodel, the Austrian version of the franchise
Africa's Next Top Model, the African version of the franchise

No relation to the show:
Afghanistan's Next Top Model, unofficial title of a similar show broadcast in Afghanistan

See also

Anth (disambiguation)